Tusten may be

 Benjamin Tusten, a military leader killed at the Battle of Minisink. 
 Tusten, New York, a town named after Benjamin Tusten.